The Drivin' Fool is a 1923 American silent comedy action film directed by Robert Thornby and starring Wally Van, Alec B. Francis, and Patsy Ruth Miller.

Cast

Preservation
With no prints of The Drivin' Fool located in any film archives, it is a lost film.

References

Bibliography
 Munden, Kenneth White. The American Film Institute Catalog of Motion Pictures Produced in the United States, Part 1. University of California Press, 1997.

External links

1923 films
1920s action comedy films
American silent feature films
American action comedy films
Films directed by Robert Thornby
American black-and-white films
Films distributed by W. W. Hodkinson Corporation
1923 comedy films
1920s English-language films
1920s American films
Silent American comedy films